Terlinguaite is the naturally occurring mineral with formula Hg2ClO.  It is formed by the weathering of other mercury-containing minerals.  It was discovered in 1900 in the Terlingua District of Brewster County, Texas, for which it is named.  Its color is yellow, greenish yellow, brown, or olive green.

References

Mercury minerals
Halide minerals
Geology of Texas
Oxychlorides
Monoclinic minerals
Minerals in space group 15